Gersdorf is a municipality in the district of Zwickau in Saxony in Germany. The conductor Günther Müller was born in Gersdorf in 1925.

References 

Zwickau (district)